Century Square (Chinese: 世纪广场) is a 6-storey shopping mall in Tampines, Singapore. It is located near Tampines MRT station and next to Tampines Mall. Opened in 1995, Century Square underwent expansion in 2005 and renovations in 2018.

History
Developed by First Capital Corporation Ltd (now GuocoLand), Century Square was opened in July 1995 with 63 tenants, officially opening on 25 November 1995 by then-Minister for Home Affairs Wong Kan Seng. It was one of the first shopping malls in Tampines, along with Tampines Mall which opened in December that year. The mall featured a K-MART department store (later replaced by Metro), a privately owned Century Cineplex managed by Shaw Theatres, Food Junction, SAFE Superstore, and a Shop N Save supermarket. Nine years later, it was sold to AsiaMalls Management Pte Ltd (ARMF Pte Ltd).

Century Square underwent a minor renovation under the new management. In 2007, Metro closed its doors and was replaced by BHG. Many new stores and brands were added along with a refreshed tenant mix by taking up a portion of Metro's former premises, thus becoming a ladies focused mall.

The mall did not underwent any major renovations until August 2017, when it closed its doors for a nine-month extensive refurbishment from September 2017 till June 2018. The building's facade was modernised, and the interior layout was changed. Current tenants include Ichiban Boshi, PrettyFIT, SHINE, Food Junction, Moda Paolo, Jollibee, Prime Food and Grocer, Haidilao, ToTT and The Food Market by Food Junction. Filmgarde Cineplexes closed on 25 April 2022.

See also
 Tampines Mall
 Tampines 1
 White Sands
 Eastpoint Mall

References

Shopping malls in Singapore
Tampines